The SCW Heavyweight Championship was a professional wrestling heavyweight championship in Southern Championship Wrestling (SCW). It remained active until November 20, 2004, when SCW was closed.

The inaugural champion was Boris Dragoff, who defeated Ricky Lee in a tournament final on January 7, 1995, to become the first SCW Heavyweight Champion. Otto Schwanz holds the record for most reigns, with five. At 497 days, C. W. Anderson's first and only reign is the longest in the title's history. Schwanz's fifth reign was the shortest in the history of the title as it was won on the promotions final show. Overall, there have been 30 reigns shared between 19 wrestlers, with nine vacancies, and 1 deactivation.

Title history
Key

Names

Reigns

List of combined reigns

Footnotes

References
General

Specific

External links
SCWprowrestling.com
SCW Heavyweight Title at Genickbruch.com

Heavyweight wrestling championships